The Civil Registry and Identification Service is the Chilean public service in charge of registering civil statuses of persons and other issues which, by law, it has to register.

Bibliography
Departamento de Estudios Financieros del Ministerio de Hacienda. 1958. Manual de Organización del Gobierno de Chile. Santiago de Chile. Talleres Gráficos La Nación S.A.

External links
Official website 

Government of Chile
Civil registries